This is a list of mountain ranges in Asia.

Lists

References

 
Asia, List of mountain ranges of